Andrew Palmer (March 28, 1808 – February 11, 1891) was a member of the Wisconsin State Senate.

Biography
Palmer was born in Binghamton, New York. He moved to Toledo, Ohio in 1833, where he published The Blade. In 1845, he moved to Janesville, Wisconsin.

Palmer was married to Mary Hutchinson Mulford and they had six children. He died on February 11, 1891.

Political career
Palmer, Son of Sylvanus Palmer and Annatje Gardinier, was a member of the Senate from 1851 to 1852 as a Democrat. Previously, he was an unsuccessful candidate for Mayor of Toledo in 1837.

References

Politicians from Binghamton, New York
Politicians from Toledo, Ohio
Politicians from Janesville, Wisconsin
Democratic Party Wisconsin state senators
Ohio Democrats
19th-century American newspaper publishers (people)
1808 births
1891 deaths
19th-century American journalists
American male journalists
19th-century American male writers
19th-century American politicians
Journalists from New York (state)
Journalists from Ohio
Writers from Binghamton, New York